Czersk may refer to the following places:
Czersk, Greater Poland Voivodeship (west-central Poland)
Czersk, Masovian Voivodeship (east-central Poland)
Czersk in Pomeranian Voivodeship (north Poland)